James McDewitt was a Scottish professional football manager who coached French team Nice between 1932 and 1934.

References

Year of birth missing
Year of death missing
Scottish football managers
Scottish expatriate football managers
Scottish expatriate sportspeople in France
Expatriate football managers in France